WSOL (1090 AM) is a radio station broadcasting a Spanish Variety format. Licensed to San Germán, Puerto Rico, it serves the western Puerto Rico area.  The station is currently owned by San German Broadcasters Group.

External links

SOL
Radio stations established in 1961
1961 establishments in Puerto Rico
San Germán, Puerto Rico